Kost Lavro (born in 1961 near Poltava) is a Ukrainian artist and illustrator. He is a close collaborator with the poet and publisher Ivan Malkovych.

Education
Lavro studied art early at the Shevchenko State Art School (his classmates there included Alina Panova, Roman Turovsky and Yuri Makoveychuk) and the Kyiv Polygraphic Institute.

Career

Works

References 

1961 births
Living people
Ukrainian artists
People from Poltava Oblast
Shevchenko State Art School alumni